This is a list of acts of the Parliament of South Africa enacted in the years 1930 to 1939.

South African acts are uniquely identified by the year of passage and an act number within that year. Some acts have gone by more than one short title in the course of their existence; in such cases each title is listed with the years in which it applied.

1930

1931

1932

1933

1934

1935

1936

1937

1938

1939

References
 Government Gazette of the Union of South Africa, Volumes LXXIX–CXVII.
 

1930